Clinidium calcaratum is a species of ground beetle in the subfamily Rhysodinae. It was described by John Lawrence LeConte in 1875. It is known from the western North America between California and British Columbia.

Clinidium calcaratum measure  in length.

References

Clinidium
Beetles of North America
Beetles described in 1875
Taxa named by John Lawrence LeConte